Margaret "Maggie" Lowe Benston (1937–1991) was a professor of chemistry, computing science, and women's studies at Simon Fraser University in Vancouver, British Columbia, Canada. She was a respected feminist and labour activist, as well as a founding member of the Vancouver Women's Caucus, in 1988, the Euphoniously Feminist and Non-Performing Quintet in 1970, Simon Fraser University's Women's Studies Program in 1975, and Mayworks in 1988. For thirty years, Benston worked locally, nationally, and internationally writing articles, giving speeches, and lobbying politicians on behalf of the women's and labour movement. Benston died of cancer on 7 March 1991.

Academic work 

Margaret Benston obtained an undergraduate degree in chemistry and philosophy and a PhD in theoretical chemistry from the University of Washington in 1964. Following this, she worked as a post-doctoral student at the University of Wisconsin.  Benston joined Simon Fraser University as a charter faculty member in 1966 in the Department of Chemistry. She was one of the founders of Women's Studies program in the mid-1970s, and taught in the program part-time.  Best known for articles such as "Infrared Spectroscopy" in The Annual Review of Physical Chemistry and "New Force Theorem" in The Journal of Chemistry and Physics, Benston continued as a practicing scientist throughout her life, but also went on to be more involved in feminism and activism.  Her 1969 essay, The Political Economy of Women's Liberation, was one of the first Marxist feminist critiques from a Canadian perspective. This article helped establish the framework for much of the feminist debates in the 1970s, as it was one of the first to use a Marxist parameter to explain the oppression of women. The article was later reproduced in books such as Liberation Now? Women in a Made-Made World and Feminist Frameworks, it was also translated into Spanish, French, Italian, Swedish, German, and Japanese.

In the 1980s, Benston became interested in computer science. She switched fields and received a joint appointment in the Women's Studies and Computing Science departments. Thereafter she explored the relationship between computerization, women, and work.

Benston was the first to argue that women formed a reserve army of labour, a group that could be manipulated in a certain way because women are responsible for the reproduction of labour power. She argued that women's domestic and wage labour were essential to the flow of capitalist production and that women could not be fully integrated into wage labour without a full transformation in both of the forms of labour, which ultimately would mean a transformation of capitalism. In turn, this created the view that women form a class because of their domestic labour, this became known internationally as the domestic labour debate.

Personal life and activism 

Committed to social justice, Benston was a founding member of the Euphoniously Feminist and Non-Performing Quintet, groups who taught feminist labour and anti-war songs to audiences at picket lines and rallies. As a labour activist, she helped found Vancouver Mayworks (a cultural festival celebrating workers), the Vancouver Women's Caucus, a New Left political craze that swept Simon Fraser University in the late 1960s, and Women's Skills Development of British Columbia. A music fan, she played a leading role in establishing the Vancouver Folk Music Festival. Benston also helped start the Vancouver Mayworks, a festival that celebrated workers' culture. Mayworks is currently a Festival of Labour and the Arts, with active participants in Parksville, Comox Valley and Campbell River, on Vancouver Island.

With five other women (Mary Vickers, Hilda Ching, Abby Schwarz, Mary Jo Duncan, Diana Herbst), Benston founded The Society for Canadian Women in Science and Technology (SCWIST) in Vancouver in 1981,  which aims to "support and promote the education of girls and women through programs and activities that we develop in partnership with the community." Benston died in 1991 at age 52, after a long battle with cancer.

Legacy 

The Maggie Benston Centre at Simon Fraser University was the second campus building named after a woman at the university (the first being the Madge Hogarth residence).

The Margaret Lowe Benston Memorial Graduate Bursary in Gender, Sexuality and Women's Studies is named after her. The purpose of this award is to provide financial support for students in the MA and PhD programs in the Department of Gender, Sexuality, and Women's Studies at Simon Fraser University.

Begun in 1994, the "Margaret Lowe Benston (MLB) Lecture Series in Social Justice is financed by an endowment established in her memory.  There is an annual event hosted by the Department of Gender, Sexuality, and Women's Studies at Simon Fraser University.  Events are often lectures but have also included dance performances and film presentations (ex. My Name Was January).  Some past speakers/presenters include Alex Sangha, Elina Gress, Lenee Son, Velvet Steele, and Natasha Adsit (2019), Susan Stryker (2014), Maude Barlow, Sitara Thobani (2008), Arno Kamolika, Doudou Diene, Lisa Helps, Becki Ross & Jamie Lee Hamilton, Joan Sangster, Chris E. Vargas,  Marilyn Waring and Leslie Feinberg. The events continue to be highly successful, having a general attendance of between 200 and 320 people.

Publications

Books

Book chapters

Articles

Papers

Further reading

References 

1937 births
1991 deaths
Canadian chemists
Canadian women computer scientists
Canadian computer scientists
Canadian Marxists
Women Marxists
Canadian feminists
Marxist feminists
Canadian socialist feminists
Scientists from Vancouver
Academic staff of Simon Fraser University